Vítor Manuel da Silva Marques (born 16 March 1969), commonly known as Vitinha, was a Portuguese futsal player who played as a defender. Vitinha captained the Portugal national team, and was the most capped player alongside André Lima upon his retirement from the team.

References

External links

1969 births
Living people
People from Castro Daire
Portuguese men's futsal players
Sporting CP futsal players
S.L. Benfica futsal players
Sportspeople from Viseu District